Edgars or Edgar is an unincorporated community located within Woodbridge Township in Middlesex County, New Jersey, United States.  It approximately includes the area around Woodbridge High School over to Rahway Avenue, south of the Port Reading Railroad.  The upper section of Ridgedale Avenue is known as Edgar's Hill.  There was a Pennsylvania Railroad stop called Edgars approximately where Prospect Avenue would cross the railway, steps for this are still visible on the western side as of 2016.

See also
List of neighborhoods in Woodbridge Township, New Jersey
List of neighborhoods in Edison, New Jersey

References

Neighborhoods in Woodbridge Township, New Jersey
Unincorporated communities in Middlesex County, New Jersey
Unincorporated communities in New Jersey